Lygaria is a village in the municipality of Tyrnavos. Before 1966 it was a part of the community of Argyropouli. The 2011 census recorded 56 inhabitants in the village. Lygaria is a part of the community of Tyrnavos.

The settlement was recorded as a village and as "Karadere" in the Ottoman Tahrir Defter number 101 from 1521. Moreover in the Ottoman Tahrir Defter number 225 from 1544 the village had Yörük households under the Yörüks of Selanik military branch, which had military obligations that required them to give 5 cavalrymen per household.

Population
According to the 2011 census, the population of the settlement of Lygaria was 56 people, a decrease of almost 24% compared with the population of the previous census of 2001.

See also
 List of settlements in the Larissa regional unit

References

Populated places in Larissa (regional unit)